A Japanese Accepted Name (JAN) is the official non-proprietary or generic name given to a pharmaceutical substance by the government of Japan.

See also 
 International Nonproprietary Name (INN)
 United States Adopted Name (USAN)
 British Approved Name (BAN)

References 

Naming conventions
Pharmacological classification systems
Japanese names